Berd Spit is a city park in Berdsk of Novosibirsk Oblast, Russia. It is a specially protected natural area since 2006.

Geography
Berd Spit is a peninsula. It is a natural border between Novosibirsk Reservoir and Berd Bay.

Flora and fauna
210 invertebrates, 55 birds, 17 mammals, 4 amphibians, 2 reptiles and 127 plants.

9 animal species and 3 plant species are listed in Red Data Book of the Novosibirsk Oblast.

References

Protected areas of Siberia
Parks in Russia
Landforms of Novosibirsk Oblast
Peninsulas of Russia
Berdsk